Samuli Kaivonurmi (born 3 March 1988) is a Finnish former professional footballer who played as a forward.

References
kups.fi Profile
Veikkausliiga Hall of Fame

1988 births
Living people
Finnish footballers
Kuopion Palloseura players
Kotkan Työväen Palloilijat players
Veikkausliiga players
Pallo-Kerho 37 players
Association football forwards
People from Kuopio
Sportspeople from North Savo